Gao Haisheng (born 6 January 1997) is a Chinese footballer who currently plays for Zibo Cuju in the China League One.

Club career
Gao Haisheng joined Chinese Super League side Shanghai SIPG's youth academy in November 2014 when Shanghai SIPG bought Shanghai Luckystar's youth team. He was promoted to the first team squad by André Villas-Boas in the 2017 season. On 15 July 2017, Gao made his senior debut in a 3–1 away win against Yanbian Funde. On 11 May 2018, Gao involved in a car accident on a drunk driving. He received an administrative detention on suspicion of dangerous driving. He was excluded from the first team squad in July 2018.

Career statistics
.

Honours

Club
Shanghai SIPG
Chinese Super League: 2018

References

External links
 

1997 births
Living people
Chinese footballers
People from Lu'an
Footballers from Anhui
Shanghai Port F.C. players
Guizhou F.C. players
Chinese Super League players
China League One players
Association football midfielders